Dualla is a village in County Tipperary, Ireland. It is located near Cashel on the R691 road. Its modern name derives from the Irish Dumha Aille, meaning 'mound of the cliff'. Dualla National School began educating pupils in May 1861 and officially opened a new school in June 2012.

(There is a local 'Big House' known as Dually and the settlement is marked as Dually on roadmaps. However all local signage refers to the place as Dualla; as do the Local Council and residents - see thumbnail).

Sport
The local GAA team is Boherlahen–Dualla GAA.

Dualla Show 

The village is host to the Dualla Show, a large agricultural event hosted every August. The show attracts thousands of visitors and is home to one of the country's most notable tractor-pulling contests. Another show held locally is the Dualla Thrashing.

People
Charles Bianconi died in Longfield House in nearby Boherlahan.

See also
List of towns and villages in Ireland

References

External links
 Dualla National School
 Dually House - Buildings of Ireland
 Boherlahan Dualla Parish Website
 Dualla Show

Towns and villages in County Tipperary
Articles on towns and villages in Ireland possibly missing Irish place names